Campo de Montiel may refer to:
 Campo de Montiel (Albacete)
 Campo de Montiel (Ciudad Real)